Summary process may refer to:

 Summary offence, a summary way to proceed in criminal cases;
 Eviction, a summary way to evict a tenant in landlord-tenant disputes